Women Don't Want To is a 1993 Italian romantic comedy film written and directed  by Pino Quartullo.

Plot

Cast

Pino Quartullo as Luca  
Lucrezia Lante della Rovere as  Francesca   
Antonella Ponziani as   Ricky   
Rosalinda Celentano as  Claudia   
 Francesca Reggiani as Marta   
 Giuseppe Antonelli  as  Sandro
 Patrizia Loreti as  Patrizia  
Alessandra Acciai as Girl on the Scooter 
 Maurizio Aiello as Luca's Colleague 
 Beatrice Palme as Blonde Girl at the Bar 
Veronika Logan as Girl Chasing Luca 
 Severino Antinori as himself 
 Jane Alexander
 Paola Minaccioni

See also      
 List of Italian films of 1993

References

External links

Women Don't Want To at Variety Distribution

Italian romantic comedy films
1993 romantic comedy films
Films directed by Pino Quartullo
1993 films
1990s Italian-language films
1990s Italian films